is a subgenre of Japanese fantasy media centered around young girls who use magic, often through an alter ego into which they can transform. Since the genre's emergence in the 1960s, media including anime, manga, OVAs, ONAs, films, and live-action series have been produced.

Japan

References

magical girls